The 1894 Pennsylvania gubernatorial election occurred on November 6, 1894. Republican candidate Daniel H. Hastings defeated Democratic candidate William M. Singerly to become Governor of Pennsylvania.

Results

References

1894
Pennsylvania
Gubernatorial
November 1894 events